Elections in Alabama are authorized under the Alabama State Constitution,  which establishes elections for the state level officers, cabinet, and legislature, and the election of county-level officers, including members of school boards.

The office of the Alabama Secretary of State has an Elections Division that oversees the execution of elections under state law.

In a 2020 study, Alabama was ranked as the 12th hardest state for citizens to vote in.

State elections

History
With the disenfranchisement of blacks at the turn of the 20th century after the Reconstruction era, Alabama Democrats suppressed populist challenges and the state became part of the "Solid South." This constitution was not initially supported by the majority of whites, but Democrats used the call of white supremacy to gain passage. In addition to wanting to affirm white supremacy, the planter and business elite were concerned about voting by lower-class and uneducated whites. Historian J. Morgan Kousser found, "They disfranchised these whites as willingly as they deprived blacks of the vote." After passage, the 1901 constitution's provisions for a grandfather clause, cumulative poll taxes, literacy tests, and increased residency requirements state, county and precinct effectively disenfranchised many poor whites as well, to enable elite control. Glenn Feldman has documented that in total, by 1941 more whites than blacks had been disenfranchised in Alabama under this constitution. The Democratic Party dominated politics in every Southern state. For nearly 100 years, local and state elections in Alabama were decided in the Democratic Party primary, with generally only token Republican challengers running in the General Election. Republicans ran a token candidate in every Alabama gubernatorial election except for 1930 and 1962. Their highest vote total between disenfranchisement and 1966 was the 21.28% of the vote they gained in 1922. Alabama was unusual among Deep South states in even having a token Republican running in the gubernatorial  election. In nearby states like Georgia, South Carolina, Louisiana and Mississippi, Republicans did not field a gubernatorial candidate until the 1960s.

Demographic changes and developments in the 1986 Democratic primary election led to the election of the first Republican governor by majority-white voters in more than a century. This was the beginning of what is now Republican political dominance in the state. One million voters cast ballots in the 1986 Democratic primary. The then-incumbent lieutenant governor, Bill Baxley, lost the Democratic nomination for governor by approximately 8,000 votes to then fellow Democratic Attorney General Charles Graddick.

The state Democratic party's five-member election contest committee invalidated the primary election result, claiming that thousands of Republicans had "illegally" voted in the Democratic primary for Graddick. As a result, they removed Graddick from the ballot. The Democratic Party placed Baxley's name on the ballot as the Democratic candidate instead of Graddick. The voters of the state revolted at what they perceived as disenfranchisement of their right to vote and elected the Republican challenger, Guy Hunt, as governor. Hunt was nominated in a statewide Republican primary that had 28,000 participants, compared to >1,000,000 in the Democratic primary. That November, Hunt became the first Republican governor elected in Alabama since Reconstruction, winning 57 percent of the vote statewide against Baxley.

Since 1986, Republicans have won six of the seven gubernatorial elections and become increasingly competitive in Alabama politics at many levels. They currently control two seats of Alabama's U.S. Senate delegation and six out of seven of the state's U.S. Representative delegation. And all 9 seats on the Supreme Court of Alabama are held by Republicans.

Two Republican lieutenant governors have been elected since Reconstruction, Steve Windom and Kay Ivey, the current governor. Windom served as lieutenant governor under Democratic Gov. Don Siegelman. Before 2011, the last time that Alabama had a governor and lieutenant governor of the same party was the period between 1983 and 1987 when George Wallace was serving his fourth term as governor and Bill Baxley was serving as lieutenant governor; both were Democrats.

21st century
Republicans held all nine seats on the Alabama Supreme Court and all ten seats on the state appellate courts.  Until 1994, no Republicans held any of the state court seats. In the 1994 general election, the then-incumbent Chief Justice of Alabama, Ernest C. Hornsby, refused to leave office after losing the election by precisely 262 votes to Republican Perry O. Hooper Sr.  Hornsby sued Alabama and defiantly remained in office for nearly a year before finally giving up the seat after losing a long court battle that included a decision by the very Supreme Court of which he himself was the Chief Justice. This ultimately led to a collapse of support for Democrats at the ballot box in the next three or four election cycles. The Democrats lost the last of the nineteen court seats in August 2011 with the resignation of the last Democrat on the bench.

Republicans hold all seven of the statewide elected executive branch offices.  Republicans hold six of the eight elected seats on the Alabama State Board of Education.  In 2010, Republicans took large majorities of both chambers of the state legislature, giving them control of that body for the first time in 136 years.  Democrats lost their last remaining statewide office in November 2012 with the re-election defeat of the president of the Alabama Public Service Commission, thus giving Republicans all three of its seats.

Local elections
In the late 20th century, Alabama maintained its extensive system of at-large voting for most county and municipal offices, including County Commissioners, Boards of Education, Tax Assessors, Tax Collectors, etc. As a result, in majority-white jurisdictions, black minorities, even when significant in proportion and then able to register and vote, were generally unable to elect any candidates of their choice in such elections. These practices were challenged by plaintiffs under Dillard v. Crenshaw County (1986). The federal district judge found that the state's broad use of at-large elections had a racially discriminatory purpose and violated Section 2 of the Voting Rights Act of 1965. The state's use of a "place system", which precluded single-shot voting, was found specifically to have been adopted to "impede the ability of African-American voters to elect" candidates of their choice.

Following the court ruling on the state's use of this system, the plaintiffs expanded their dilution claims in Dillard in an omnibus application to "include the at-large election systems to include other county commissions, county school boards, and municipal councils across the state." The amended complaint covered nearly "200 units of local government", challenging at-large systems in local jurisdictions in which blacks were at least 10 percent of the population. Most of the affected jurisdictions settled these cases by adopting single-member district systems (SMDs), which has resulted in the election of more  blacks to local offices, generally in proportion to their part of the jurisdiction's population; this has resulted in more Democrats being elected to office. Limited voting schemes were adopted by 21 municipalities in negotiation with the plaintiffs, and another six jurisdictions adopted cumulative voting arrangements. As a result, total representation by black candidates has increased in local elections for municipal and county government, as well as county school boards. Elections have been held since 1988 under these alternative systems.

As of the early 21st century, local elections in most rural counties, many of which are black dominated, are generally decided in the Democratic primary, and local elections in metropolitan and suburban counties, which are generally white majority, are decided in the Republican primary, although there are exceptions.

Alabama's 67 County Sheriffs are elected in partisan elections, and Democrats until 2016 retained the majority of those posts. The current split as of April 2017 is 32 Democrats, 34 Republicans, and 1 Independent (Fayette). Most Democrat sheriffs have been elected in rural counties. The majority of Republican sheriffs have been elected in more urban/suburban and heavily populated counties, which tend to be majority white. Just two of 19 Alabama counties with a population of over 75,000 (Limestone and Montgomery) have a Democratic sheriff; and seventeen of 48 Alabama counties with a population of under 75,000 have Republican sheriffs (Autauga, Bibb, Blount, Cherokee, Chilton, Clarke, Cleburne, Crenshaw, Coffee, Coosa, Covington, Dale, Geneva, Jackson, Tallapoosa, Walker, and Winston). The state has one female sheriff (Morgan) and ten black sheriffs (Bullock, Greene, Hale, Lowndes, Macon, Marengo, Montgomery, Perry, Sumter, and Wilcox).

Federal elections

History

From 1876 through 1956, Alabama supported only Democratic presidential candidates, by large margins. There were only two exceptions; the 1928 elections in which the Democrats won by a much smaller margin than normal due to Anti-Catholic prejudices against the Democratic candidate Al Smith, and the 1948 election when Alabama, along with Mississippi, Louisiana, and South Carolina, voted for Strom Thurmond of the pro-segregation States Rights Democratic Party. In 1960, the Democrats won with John F. Kennedy on the ballot.  However, six of the state's 11 Democratic electors were members of the unpledged elector movement, and gave their electoral votes as a protest to Harry Byrd.

In 1964, the state swung over dramatically to support Republican Barry Goldwater, who carried the state with an unheard-of 69 percent of the vote, carrying all but five counties. He was the first Republican to carry the state since 1872. Like much of the Deep South, Alabama's voters turned violently on President Lyndon Johnson in the wake of the Civil Rights Act of 1964.

In the 1968 presidential election, Alabama supported native son and American Independent Party candidate George Wallace over both Richard Nixon and Hubert Humphrey. Wallace was the official Democratic candidate in Alabama, while Humphrey was the National Democratic nominee. In 1976, Democratic candidate Jimmy Carter from Georgia carried the state, but Democratic control proved to be temporary- Carter is the only Democrat since 1964 to carry the state.

Alabama does not register voters by party, but in recent statewide elections, Republican turnout in statewide primaries has consistently exceeded that for the Democrats. Alabama is now considered a Republican stronghold at both the federal and state level, although Democrats still retain a slim majority in many local offices (sheriffs, county commissioners, etc.). The state has voted Republican in every presidential election since 1980, and Democrats have not seriously contested the state since.  Republicans have also done increasingly well in Senate and House elections; they have held a majority of the state's congressional delegation and both Senate seats since 1997, although they briefly lost a Senate seat from 2018 to 2021. In 2010, Republicans won large majorities in both chambers of the Alabama Legislature ending 136 years of Democratic rule; see Dixiecrat. In 2012, Democrats lost the only remaining statewide office the party still held giving Republicans control of all 10 state constitutional offices.  The GOP also has won all 19 statewide court seats.

The 11 counties that consistently vote Democratic are Black Belt counties, where African Americans are the majority racial group. Republicans have gotten over 60% of the vote in every presidential election since 2004.

Presidential elections

See also
Government of Alabama
Political party strength in Alabama
Politics of Alabama
Elections in the United States
Women's suffrage in Alabama

References

External links
 
 
Alabama Elections | Bama Politics

Political events in Alabama
Government of Alabama
History of voting rights in the United States